Pietro Partesotti (born 10 April 1941) is an Italian racing cyclist. He rode in the 1965 Tour de France.

References

External links
 

1941 births
Living people
Italian male cyclists
Place of birth missing (living people)
Sportspeople from Reggio Emilia
Cyclists from Emilia-Romagna